Thorite, (Th,U)SiO4, is a rare nesosilicate of thorium that crystallizes in the tetragonal system and is isomorphous with zircon and hafnon. It is the most common mineral of thorium and is nearly always strongly radioactive. It was named in 1829 to reflect its thorium content. Thorite was discovered in 1828 on the island of Løvøya, Norway, by the vicar and mineralogist, Hans Morten Thrane Esmark, who sent the first specimens of this black mineral to his father, Jens Esmark, who was a professor of mineralogy and geology.

Occurrence

Specimens of thorite generally come from igneous pegmatites and volcanic extrusive rocks, hydrothermal veins and contact metamorphic rocks. It is also known to occur as small grains in detrital sands. Crystals are rare, but when found can produce nicely shaped short prismatic crystals with pyramidal terminations.
It is commonly associated with zircon, monazite, gadolinite, fergusonite, uraninite, yttrialite and pyrochlore.

Thorite is currently an important ore of uranium. A variety of thorite, often called "uranothorite", is particularly rich in uranium and has been a viable uranium ore at Bancroft in Ontario, Canada. Other varieties of thorite include "orangite", an orange variety, and "calciothorite", an impure variety with trace amounts of calcium.

Properties
Thorite is commonly metamict and hydrated, making it optically isotropic and amorphous. Owing to differences in composition, the specific gravity varies from 4.4 to 6.6 g/cm3. Hardness is 4.5 and the luster is vitreous or resinous. The color is normally black, but also brownish black, orange, yellowish-orange and dark green.

Because thorite is highly radioactive, specimens are often metamict. This is a condition found in radioactive minerals that results from the destructive effects of its own radiation on its crystal lattice. The effect can destroy a crystal lattice completely while leaving the outward appearance unchanged.

References

External links

Thorium minerals
Uranium(IV) minerals
Nesosilicates
Tetragonal minerals
Minerals in space group 141